Bao Vo (born February 19, 1982), also known as BAO, is a Vietnamese American musician, singer-songwriter, composer, and record producer based in Los Angeles, California. 

He has done extensive work with other Asian American artists like Mariqueen Maandig and the band Ming & Ping, where he was responsible for the production, concept, branding, marketing, and visual design, in addition to being a co-writer to the music itself.

Biography
Vo was born in Da Lat, Vietnam and immigrated to the United States in 1985 with his mother and four siblings. He attended the High School for the Performing and Visual Arts (HSPVA) in Houston, TX and the Art Center College of Design in Pasadena, CA. He founded the band Ming & Ping in 2002 after dropping out of art school at San Francisco Art Institute, where he studied experimental music composition under Charles Boone, multimedia art under Sharon Grace, and digital audio production under Martin Schmidt of the experimental electronic band Matmos. 

Ming & Ping released their debut album in 2004 through the Chicago-based independent record label Omega Point Records. The group is known for their visual art, costumes, and theatrical live performances that are primarily designed and directed by Vo, whose collaboration with other artists has yielded a large portfolio of photography, illustrations, videos, and costumes that is uncommon for independent musical acts. Vo is also responsible for assembling the musical act's supporting cast for their Cantonese Opera inspired live performances known as "The Ming & Ping Dynasty." These performances have been exhibited on tour with Freezepop and with groups such as Major Lazer, West Indian Girl, and Ultraviolet Sound.

In 2017, Vo released a five-song EP titled BAO EP under the stage name BAO. In 2017, he also founded a social impact organization called Other.Us, which helped up-and-coming Asian Americans in music. In 2018, his Other.Us organization was dissolved when he joined the board of directors for The Slants Foundation, founded by musician and activist Simon Tam. His musical influences include Prince, New Order, and Giorgio Moroder. In 2019, Vo composed the soundtrack for the documentary Quan 13, starring and directed by former Anthony Bourdain: Parts Unknown producer Hieu Gray, which premiered at the headquarters of Nguoi Viet Daily News, the largest daily newspaper published in Vietnamese outside of Vietnam.

In October 2020, Vo released his debut solo album, entitled "Perpetual Heartbreak," along with three video series to enhance the way audiences consume his music. According to his social media, the three series include "BAO Feels His Music," which shows Vo's reactions to each song on the album, "Behind BAO's Music," in which Vo describes the meaning behind each track, and "BAO Breaks Down," in which Vo details the technical aspects of the album's music production.

References

External links
 Bao Vo Creative, Inc.
 BAO Official Site
 The Slants Foundation

American male songwriters
American record producers
American musicians of Vietnamese descent
Living people
Vietnamese emigrants to the United States
1982 births